Conambo is an extinct Zaparoan language formerly spoken in north-eastern Peru, near the Conambo River. Some authors consider Conambo a dialect of the Záparo language, while others consider it an independent language.

References

Extinct languages of South America